The most popular given names by state in the United States vary. This is a list of the top 10 names in each of the 50 states, Puerto Rico, and the District of Columbia for the years 2008 through 2020. This information is taken from the "Popular Baby Names" database maintained by the United States Social Security Administration.

2008

2009

2010

2011

2012

2013

2014

2015

2016

2017

2018

2019

2020

2021

References 

Most popular given names